The Kanin Peninsula is a large peninsula in Nenets Autonomous Okrug, Russia.

It is surrounded by the White Sea to the west and by the Barents Sea to the north and east. Shoyna is one of the few communities on the peninsula.

Fauna
For cetaceans, beluga whales are most commonly found. Male sperm whales are known to occur as well.

Butterflies
There are 29 butterfly species in the forest-tundra and 14 species in the hypoarctic tundra. The data on the fauna and distribution of species in the forest-tundra of the Kanin Peninsula are generally typical of this natural zone. The most abundant species are Erebia disa, Oeneis norna, Clossiana freija, Pieris napi, and Vacciniina optilete. The dominant species in southern tundra localities are Erebia euryale, Erebia pandrose, and Boloria aquilonaris, which coincides with the result of the 1903 research. A high abundance of E. pandrose is a specific feature of the northern part of the Kanin Peninsula and Kolguev Island, pointing to the connection of the biota of these territories with the subarctic regions of Fennoscandia.

Climate

The climate on the Kanin Peninsula has cold winters with moderate maritime influences and cool summers. The north has a tundra climate (ET) and the south a subarctic climate (Dfc) thanks to the warmer summers.

References

Peninsulas of Russia
Landforms of Nenets Autonomous Okrug